Dedy Yon Supriyono (born 14 August 1980) is an Indonesian politician who is the Mayor of Tegal, Central Java, serving since 2019.

Early life
Supriyono was born in Brebes Regency on 14 August 1980, the son of a successful local entrepreneur Muhadi Setiabudi.

Career
Between 2009 and 2014, Supriyono served in the legislature of Brebes Regency, where he was deputy speaker. Supriyono was a member of Central Java's Provincial Council as part of the Democratic Party's faction in the 2014–2019 term, though he ran as Tegal's mayor during his tenure. In the election, he won with 38,091 votes, and he was sworn in on 23 March 2019.

On 30 March 2020, during the COVID-19 pandemic in Indonesia, Supriyono made a decision to implement a lockdown of Tegal, which restricted movement within the city as the city's government provided some support of food supplies to poorer residents. The lockdown involved closing off of 49 access points into the city and the closure of public spaces, and was launched in response to a returning resident testing positive.

References

1980 births
Living people
Mayors and regents of places in Central Java
People from Tegal
People from Brebes Regency
Democratic Party (Indonesia) politicians
Central Java Provincial Council members
Mayors of places in Indonesia